William Clarke (13 November 1882 – 2 November 1960) was a British long-distance runner. He competed in the men's marathon at the 1908 Summer Olympics.

References

1882 births
1960 deaths
Athletes (track and field) at the 1908 Summer Olympics
British male long-distance runners
British male marathon runners
Olympic athletes of Great Britain
Place of birth missing